This is a complete list of Canadian prime ministers by date of death.

John A. Macdonald and John Thompson were the only prime ministers to die in office. Three prime ministers have died outside of Canada, all in the United Kingdom. Richard Bennett is the only prime minister to die and be buried outside of Canada.

List

References

Death, date